Varadharajapuram is a small village town of Chennai Metropolitan City in the Tamil-Nadu state, India. Varadhrajapuram lies between Mudichur and Mannivakkam, 6.5 kilometers from Tambaram. It is located along Sripermpudur State Highway.

Varadharajapuram panchayat village belongs to Kundrathur Taluk.

Nearby cities
Mudichur 2 km
Perungalathur 3.5 km
Tambaram 6.5 km
Vandalur4.5 km
Chrompet 11.5 km
Guindy 19 km

References

External links

Neighbourhoods in Chennai